Carl-Erik Nordanger Torp (born 17 September 1984) is a former Norwegian footballer who last played for SK Brann as a central midfielder. He also played futsal for NFF Futsal Eliteserie club KFUM Oslo Futsal. Torp was forced to retire from playing football in 2011 after suffering a cardiac arrest during a match.

Club career
He played on football teams Kolbotn Fotball, KFUM Oslo and Manglerud Star before joining Kongsvinger ahead of the 2007 season. In 2010, he made his debut in the Norwegian Premier League.

On 11 November 2010 he signed a 3 years contract with Tippeliga club SK Brann on a free transfer because of his contract expiration with Kongsvinger on 31 December 2010

Cardiac arrest during match

On 25 September 2011, Torp suffered cardiac arrest on the pitch after being substituted on in the 79th minute of a Norwegian National Championship game against Sogndal. A defibrillator and CPR was administered to stabilise his condition until he was air-lifted to a nearby hospital. He is now a coach at SK Brann.

Career statistics

References

1984 births
Living people
People from Kolbotn
Norwegian footballers
Norwegian men's futsal players
Kongsvinger IL Toppfotball players
Manglerud Star Toppfotball players
SK Brann players
Eliteserien players

Association football midfielders
Sportspeople from Viken (county)